Killing Zelda Sparks is a black comedy thriller film, shot in Copper Cliff, Sudbury, Ontario, Canada standing in for the town of New Essex. Post production was completed on January 24, 2007.  The film stars Colm Feore, Sarah Carter, Vincent Kartheiser, and Geoffrey Arend.  It is directed by Jeff Glickman and adapted for the screen by Josh Ben Friedman from his play Barstool Words.

The film was released on DVD on May 20, 2008.

Plot
When Zelda Sparks comes back to the small town of New Essex, two old high school buddies pull a vicious prank on her for wronging them in the past.  But they are shocked to learn that the prank may have turned deadly.

Critical reception
David Walker of DVD Talk wrote "Killing Zelda Sparks is not a bad film, just a good film that tries too hard to be quirky and innovative, which comes at the expense of the story and the characters. The film is entertaining and engaging enough to capture your interest, but it has a tough time maintaining it."

David Nusair of Reel Film Reviews said "Killing Zelda Sparks is an effectively acted yet otherwise interminable piece of work that bears all the marks of filmmaker in over his head, as director Jeff Glickman has infused the proceedings with a number of progressively ostentatious cinematic tricks that are ultimately more of a distraction than anything else.

References

External links

2007 films
English-language Canadian films
2000s thriller films
American films based on plays
Canadian thriller films
Films shot in Greater Sudbury
2000s English-language films
2000s Canadian films